The 2012–13 Valparaiso Crusaders men's basketball team represented Valparaiso University during the 2012–13 NCAA Division I men's basketball season. The Cruasaders, led by second year head coach Bryce Drew, played their home games at the Athletics–Recreation Center and were members of the Horizon League. The season finished with 26–8 in overall, 13–3 in Horizon League to become Horizon League Regular Season Champions. They were also champions of the Horizon League tournament, defeating Wright State in the championship game, for the first Horizon League title in school history. They received an automatic bid to the 2013 NCAA tournament, their first tournament bid in 9 years, where they received a 14 seed and lost to 3 seed Michigan State in the second round.

Roster

Schedule

|-
!colspan=9| Exhibition

|-
!colspan=9| Regular season

|-
!colspan=9|2013 Horizon League tournament

|-
!colspan=9|2013 NCAA tournament

References

Valparaiso
Valparaiso Beacons men's basketball seasons
Valparaiso
Valp
Valp